Slovak Airlines (Slovenské aerolínie a.s.) was an airline based in Bratislava, Slovakia. Slovak Airlines operated on the market as an air transport company, operating regular and irregular passenger, cargo and postal transit. It was the flag carrier of the Slovak Republic operating a scheduled service to Moscow and to Brussels. It also offered international charter flights to Bulgaria, Cyprus, Greece, Italy, Russia, Spain, Tunisia, and Turkey. The company also ran wet-lease operations. Its main base was M. R. Štefánik Airport, Bratislava.

The airline ceased operations in February 2007.

History 

After the famous historian event  — Dissolution of Czechoslovakia on January 1, 1993, the Slovak Republic found itself in a specific situation in the area of air transport, in that no transport company remained and even in the past there had never been an effective network of airlines directly connecting Slovakia with the rest of the world. Not a single aircraft or foreign embassy remained in Slovakia, which was a big problem in building international relations for the young republic.

A way out of the problem for the young government with Michal Kovak had been to build a transport company ensuring the connection of Slovakia with foreign countries and to resolve the entire conception of air transport, in particular in connection with tourism and the creation of an infrastructure.

In 1995 the mission of the International Civil Aviation Organisation (ICAO) on a visit to Slovakia proposed the creation of a national air transport company as one possibility of the development of civil aviation. After almost one year of intensive discussions experts agreed on the idea that it would be possible to create a strong, high quality airline company in Slovak conditions only in the form of a national airline company. The result of this endeavor was on 24 June 1995 the designation of the company Slovenské aerolínie as the national air transport company. The business plan of Slovak Airlines began with the construction of a basic network of lines over a period of 5 years and started operations in May 1998. Within the framework of the Phare programme “Air Operation Safety Improvement”, Slovak Airlines was selected as one of three operators within the states of Eastern Europe as a sample transport company and consultant in the creation of a programme of improving safety of air transport in the Phare countries. 

In January 2005 Austrian Airlines acquired the majority stake (62%) in the company. Slovak Airlines ceased operations after Austrian Airlines repossessed two aircraft having withdrawn financial support in January 2007. The company filed for bankruptcy on 2 March 2007. Large portion of employees and offices was taken over by the now-defunct Seagle Air.

Destinations 

The airline flew scheduled services from Bratislava to Brussels (7 weekly, codeshare with Austrian, Fokker 100) and Moscow Sheremetyevo (4 weekly, codeshare Aeroflot, Fokker 100).

In 2006 the airline flew the following charter flights from Bratislava (with Boeing 737-300):

 Bulgaria: Burgas
 Cyprus: Larnaca
 Egypt: Hurghada, Sharm el Sheik
 Greece: Heraklion, Chania, Karpathos, Korfu, Kos, Rhodos, Thessaloniki
 Jordan: Aqaba
 Montenegro: Tivat
 Spain: Palma de Mallorca
 Tunisia: Monastir 
 Turkey: Antalya, Dalaman

And from Košice (with Boeing 737-300):

 Bulgaria: Burgas 
 Egypt: Hurghada 
 Greece: Heraklion, Chania, Korfu, Kos, Rhodos, Thessaloniki 
 Montenegro: Tivat
 Turkey: Antalya

The airline also flew for Italian travel agencies a weekly Brescia - Rhodos service with the Boeing 737 - 300 aircraft. The smaller 100-seat Fokker 100 was used on the following charter flights for Greek travel agencies: Bratislava - Thessaloniki, Thessaloniki - Chania, Chios, Kos, Rhodos, Samos, Santorini.

Fleet 

Slovak Airlines operated the following aircraft:

References

External links

 Slovak Airlines

Defunct airlines of Slovakia
Airlines established in 1995
Airlines disestablished in 2007
Slovakian companies established in 1995